Panteón 5 de Diciembre is a cemetery in Puerto Vallarta, in the Mexican state of Jalisco.

References

External links

 

Cemeteries in Mexico
Puerto Vallarta